Såna or Hølenelva is a river which runs through Vestby, Norway. It collects a number of creeks in Ås and Vestby and runs through the villages of Såner and Hobøl, before draining into the Oslofjord at Son. It is crossed by among others the Hølen Viaduct and Hølendalen Bridges.

References

Rivers of Viken
Vestby
Rivers of Norway